Charles Mackie may refer to:

Charles Mackie (Scottish footballer) (1882–?), played in England and Scotland
Charles Mackie (New Zealand footballer) (fl. 1936), played once for New Zealand
Charles Mackie (sport shooter) (1885–?), British sport shooter
Charles Hodge Mackie (1862–1920), British artist